Conradina canescens, commonly called false rosemary, is a shrub in the mint family. It is native to the southeastern United States, where it is restricted to coastal areas of Alabama, Florida, and Mississippi. Its natural habitat is sandhills, coastal scrub, and flatwoods.

This species a shrub that produces light purple flowers. It is distinguished from other Conradina by its linear, revolute leaves that are densely gray-pubescent.

References

canescens
Plants described in 1870
Flora of Alabama
Flora of Florida
Flora of Mississippi